Theodore "Fats" Navarro (September 24, 1923 – July 6, 1950) was an American jazz trumpet player. He was a pioneer of the bebop style of jazz improvisation in the 1940s. He had a strong stylistic influence on many other players, including Clifford Brown.

Life
Navarro was born in Key West, Florida, United States, of Cuban, African, and Chinese descent. He began playing piano at age six, but did not become serious about music until he began playing trumpet at the age of thirteen. He was a childhood friend of drummer Al Dreares. By the time he graduated from Douglass High School, he wanted to be away from Key West and joined a dance band headed for the Midwest.

Navarro gained valuable experience touring in bands, including Snookum Russell's territory band, where he met and influenced a young J.J. Johnson. Tiring of the life on the road, Navarro settled in New York City in 1946, where his career took off. He met and played with, among others, Charlie Parker. But Navarro was in a position to demand a high salary and did not join one of Parker's regular groups. He also developed a heroin addiction, tuberculosis, and a weight problem. (He was nicknamed "Fat Girl" due to his weight and high speaking voice.) These afflictions led to a slow decline in health. Navarro was hospitalized on July 1, 1950 and he died five days later on July 6 at the age of 26. His last performance was with Charlie Parker on July 1 at Birdland.

Navarro played in the Andy Kirk, Billy Eckstine, Benny Goodman, and Lionel Hampton big bands, and participated in small group recording sessions with Kenny Clarke, Tadd Dameron, Eddie "Lockjaw" Davis, Coleman Hawkins, Illinois Jacquet, Howard McGhee, and Bud Powell.

Death
Navarro died of tuberculosis and heroin addiction in New York City on July 6, 1950, and was survived by wife Rena (née Clark, 1927–1975) and his daughter Linda (1949–2014). He was buried in an unmarked grave, number 414, at the Rose Hill Cemetery in Linden, New Jersey.

In 1982, Navarro was inducted into the DownBeat Hall of Fame.

In September 2002, friends and family members dedicated a headstone for Fats Navarro's grave. The event of dedication was sponsored by the Jazz Alliance International while the day of it was proclaimed as Fats Navarro Day by the mayor of Linden.

During the ceremony, Linden High School Choir performed "Amazing Grace", while trumpeter Jon Faddis played Navarro's "Nostalgia". The night of the same day, 14 trumpeters joined a stellar rhythm section to honor the Navarro songbook at the Jazz Standard in Manhattan. Faddis, who assembled the section under musical direction from Don Sickler, was accompanied by drummer Billy Drummond, bassist Peter Washington, and pianist James Williams.

Discography

1943
Andy Kirk – "Fare Thee Well Honey" c/w "Baby, Don't You Tell Me No Lie" (Decca 4449)

1944
Andy Kirk and his Orchestra– Live at the Apollo 1944–1947 (Everybody's EV 3003)
Andy Kirk – Andy's Jive (Swing House (E) SWH 39)
Andy Kirk and his Twelve Clouds of Joy – The Uncollected Andy Kirk (Hindsight (E) HSR 227)
Andy Kirk and his Orchestra (no details) (Caracol (F) CAR 424)

1945
Andy Kirk and his Orchestra (no details) (Swing House (E) SWH 130)
Billy Eckstine – Together (Spotlite (E) SPJ 100)
Billy Eckstine – Blues for Sale (EmArcy MG 36029)
Billy Eckstine – The Love Songs of Mr. "B" (EmArcy MG 36030)
Various Artists – The Advance Guard of the '40s (EmArcy MG 36016)
Billy Eckstine – You Call It Madness (Regent MG 6058)
Billy Eckstine – Prisoner of Love (Regent MG 6052)

1946
Andy Kirk – "He's My Baby" c/w "Soothe Me" (Decca 23870)
Andy Kirk – "Alabama Bound" c/w "Doggin' Man Blues" (Decca 48073)
Billy Eckstine – My Deep Blue Dream (Regent MG 6054)
Billy Eckstine – I Surrender, Dear (EmArcy MG 36010)
Various Artists – Boning Up the 'Bones (EmArcy MG 36038)
Billy Eckstine – Mr. B and the Band (Savoy SJL 2214)
Various Artists – The Bebop Era (RCA Victor LPV 519)
Fats Navarro Memorial: Fats - Bud - Klook - Sonny - Kinney (Savoy MG 12011)
Earl Bud Powell – Burning in U.S.A., 53-55, Vol. 2 (Mythic Sound MS 6002-2)
Fats Navarro Memorial, Vol. 2: Nostalgia  (Savoy MG 12133)
Various Artists – In the Beginning Bebop! (Savoy MG 12119)
Coleman Hawkins – Bean and the Boys (Prestige PR 7824)

1947
Illinois Jacquet – Illinois Jacquet and his Tenor Sax (Aladdin AL 803)
Various Artists – Opus de Bop (Savoy MG 12114)
Billy Stewart/Ray Abrams – "Gloomy Sunday" c/w "In My Solitude" (Savoy 647)
Milton Buggs/Ray Abrams – "I Live True to You" c/w "Fine Brown Frame" (Savoy 648)
Various Artists – Jazz Off the Air, Vol. 2 (Vox VSP 310)
Fats Navarro – The Fabulous Fats Navarro, Vol. 1 (Blue Note BLP 1531)
Fats Navarro – Fat Girl (Savoy SJL 2216)
Charlie Parker – "Anthropology" (Spotlite (E) SPJ 108)
Coleman Hawkins – His Greatest Hits 1939–47, Vol. 17 (RCA (F) 730625)
Coleman Hawkins – Body and Soul: A Jazz Autobiography (RCA Victor LPV 501)
Various Artists – All American Hot Jazz (RCA Victor LPV 544)

1948
Lionel Hampton and his Orchestra – 1948 (Weka (Swt) Jds 12-1)
Lionel Hampton – Lionel Hampton in Concert (Cicala Jazz Live (It) BLJ 8015)
Fats Navarro Featured with the Tadd Dameron Quintet (Jazzland JLP 50)
The Tadd Dameron Band – 1948 (Jazzland JLP 68)
Benny Goodman/Charlie Barnet – Capitol Jazz Classics, Vol. 15: Bebop Spoken Here (Capitol M 11061)
Fats Navarro – The Fabulous Fats Navarro, Vol. 2 (Blue Note BLP 1532)
Various Artists – The Other Side Blue Note 1500 Series (Blue Note (J) BNJ 61008/10)
The Complete Blue Note and Capitol Recordings of Fats Navarro and Tadd Dameron (Blue Note CDP 7243 8 33373-2)
Earl Coleman – "I Wished on the Moon" c/w "Guilty" (Dial 756)
Dexter Gordon – Move! (Spotlite (E) SPJ 133)

1949
The Metronome All Stars – From Swing to Be-Bop (RCA Camden CAL 426) - released on Dizzy Gillespie's The Complete RCA Victor Recordings (Bluebird, 1937–1949, [1995])
Dizzy Gillespie – Strictly Be Bop (Capitol M 11059)
Jazz at the Philharmonic – J.A.T.P. at Carnegie Hall 1949 (Pablo PACD 5311-2)
Bud Powell – The Amazing Bud Powell, Vol. 1 (Blue Note BLP 1503)
Various Artists – 25 Years of Prestige (Prestige PR 24046)
Miles Davis/Dizzy Gillespie/Fats Navarro – Trumpet Giants (New Jazz NJLP 8296)
Don Lanphere/Fats Navarro/Leo Parker/Al Haig – Prestige First Sessions, Vol. 1 (Prestige PRCD 24114-2)

1950
Charlie Parker - Fats Navarro - Bud Powell (Ozone 4)
Charlie Parker – One Night in Birdland (Columbia JG 34808)
Charlie Parker - Bud Powell - Fats Navarro (Ozone 9)
Miles Davis – Hooray for Miles Davis, Vol. 1 (Session Disc 101)
Miles Davis All Stars and Gil Evans (Beppo (E) BEP 502)
Miles Davis – The Persuasively Coherent Miles Davis (Alto AL 701)
Miles Davis – Hooray for Miles Davis, Vol. 2 (Session Disc 102)

Compilations
1995: The Complete Blue Note and Capitol Recordings of Fats Navarro and Tadd Dameron (Blue Note)

References

External links

Biography of Fats Navarro

1923 births
1950 deaths
American jazz trumpeters
American male trumpeters
American people of Chinese descent
American people of Cuban descent
Bebop trumpeters
Blue Note Records artists
People from Key West, Florida
Savoy Records artists
20th-century American musicians
American male jazz musicians
20th-century deaths from tuberculosis
Tuberculosis deaths in New York (state)
Deaths by heroin overdose in New York (state)
Drug-related deaths in New York City
20th-century American male musicians